Carabus faustus is a species of ground beetle from Carabinae subfamily that is endemic to the Canary Islands.

References

faustus
Beetles described in 1836
Endemic fauna of the Canary Islands
Insects of the Canary Islands